This page lists board and card games, wargames, miniatures games, and tabletop role-playing games published in 1975.  For video games, see 1975 in video gaming.

Games released or invented in 1975

Significant games-related events of 1975
Chaosium Inc. founded by Greg Stafford.
Fantasy Games Unlimited founded by Scott Bizar.
Games Workshop founded by Ian Livingstone and Steve Jackson.
Metagaming Concepts founded.

Deaths

See also
 1975 in video gaming

References

Games
Games by year